Theron (tee-ron) Augustus Smith (born October 3, 1980) is an American former professional basketball player of the National Basketball Association and FIBA.

Basketball career
Born in Winter Haven, Florida, Smith played collegiately for Ball State University. Two games into his senior year he tore his ACL and opted to pass on a medical redshirt senior year, instead choosing to enter into the 2003 NBA Draft.

Going undrafted, he still signed a two-year contract with the Memphis Grizzlies, appearing in 20 regular season matches during his rookie campaign (two points and rebounds per game).

Smith then played for the Charlotte Bobcats after being selected in the expansion draft, and averaged 2.8 points per game throughout his NBA career, where he totalled 53 games. Right knee problems limiting his NBA career.

In 2005–06, he played with the Denver Nuggets in preseason before going to the  NBDL's Florida Flame, and the following season represented Pallacanestro Cantú in Italy. In the following eight seasons, he continued overseas, playing for Entente Orléanaise 45 of France and Tianjin Ronggang of China, averaging 23 points, 10 rebounds and five assists per game. In 46 matches he averaged 45 mins per game. Smith also has experience playing in Romania, Venezuela, and two seasons in Argentina.

References

External links
NBA.com profile
Stats at BasketballReference
Basketpedya career data

1980 births
Living people
American expatriate basketball people in Argentina
American expatriate basketball people in China
American expatriate basketball people in France
American expatriate basketball people in Italy
American expatriate basketball people in Romania
American expatriate basketball people in Venezuela
Ball State Cardinals men's basketball players
Basketball players from Florida
Charlotte Bobcats expansion draft picks
Charlotte Bobcats players
Florida Flame players
Memphis Grizzlies players
Orléans Loiret Basket players
Pallacanestro Cantù players
People from Winter Haven, Florida
Small forwards
Undrafted National Basketball Association players
American men's basketball players